Steven James Magoffin (born 17 December 1979) is a former Australian cricketer, who most recently played for Worcestershire in English county cricket, and having previously played for Western Australia and Queensland in Australian domestic matches. He has also played county cricket as an overseas player for Surrey and Sussex.

A former Queensland Academy of Sport player, Magoffin made his debut for WA in 2004-05 where he played every Pura Cup in the season, finishing with 28 wickets at 35.10. He has a career-best haul of 8 for 20, playing for Sussex against Somerset in 2013. He played a few matches for Surrey in April and May, 2007 as a substitute for Matthew Nicholson.

In 2015, Magoffin applied for a UK passport, thus making him a naturalised UK player.

External links
 

1979 births
Australian cricketers
Cricketers from Brisbane
Living people
Queensland cricketers
Surrey cricketers
Sussex cricketers
Western Australia cricketers
Worcestershire cricketers